Olearia tasmainca is a species of flowering plant in the family Asteraceae and is endemic to Tasmania. The heads or daisy-like "flowers" have up to 8 ray florets. Flowering mainly occurs in January and the fruit is a smooth achene.

This daisy was first formally described in 1847 by Joseph Dalton Hooker who gave it the name Eurybia alpina in the London Journal of Botany from specimens collected on Mount Wellington. In 1963, Winifred Curtis changed the name to Olearia alpina in The Student's Flora of Tasmania, but that name is illegitimate because it had already been used by Buchanan for a New Zealand species (now known as Olearia lacunosa). In 1970, Curtis changed the name to Olearia tasmanica in The Victorian Naturalist.

References

Taxa named by Joseph Dalton Hooker
Plants described in 1847
Flora of Tasmania
tasmanica